Universidad Veracruzana (Spanish for University of Veracruz) is a public autonomous university located in the Mexican state of Veracruz. Established in 1944, the university is one of the most important in the southeast region of México. Its academic organization is a structure based on academic areas, schools, education programs and research institutes. Due to geographic dispersing, academic activities are coordinated by the Academic Secretariat and four Vice-Rector's Offices. General Directions of the academic areas: Arts, Biology and Agricultural Sciences, Health Sciences, Economics and Business Administration, Liberal Arts and Technical coordinate as well each school and educational programs. The Department of Research coordinates the plans and activities of the research institutes, and the Direction of Art Dissemination operates the artistic groups and the cultural activities programs.

In the region of Xalapa, the university has 32 schools, 22 institutes and research centers, one Children's Musical Induction Center, one Language Center, one Foreign Languages Department, two Self-access Language Learning Centers, two Arts Workshops, one Foreign Students School, one Advanced Technology Lab, one Analytic Resolution Support Services Unit, one School Hospital and one Library Services and Information Unit (USBI). In Veracruz, Veracruz: 13 schools, four institutes and research centers, one Children's Musical Induction Center, one Language Center, two Self-access Language Learning Centers, one Art Workshops and one USBI. In Orizaba-Córdoba, Veracruz: 8 schools, two Language Centers, two Self-access Language Learning Centers and an Advanced Technology Lab. In Poza Rica: 13 schools, one Language Center, a Self-access Language Learning Center, and two Art Workshops. And in Coatzacoalcos-Minatitlán, Veracruz, 8 schools, one Language Center, two Self-access Learning Centers and two USBIs. Furthermore, it is associated with the North American Mobility Project, a transnational academic program that links it to Georgia Southern University in the United States and Wilfrid Laurier University in Canada.

History 

The University of Veracruz was formally established on September 11, 1944. Its foundation was the consolidation of the colleges of higher education in the region. It continued the activities of existing middle and high schools along with nursing and midwifery academies from Orizaba, Xalapa and Veracruz. Immediately after, the Law School, the School of Fine Arts, the Archaeology Department, the Superior School of Music and the university radio station, XEXB, were founded. The main campus is in Xalapa.

During the 1950s, the university entered into a stage of institutional constitution, growth and disperse: New faculties were founded, new programs were developed and new high schools were created, not only in Xalapa but also in Veracruz and Orizaba. This stage did not end until 1968 when secondary education was separated from the Universidad Veracruzana by decree.

The institution's growth and expansion characterize the 1970s, as it has happened to other higher education institutions (HEI) in the country. The regionalization of the university becomes consolidate, more schools were created and the first graduate programs were developed. Research activities fostered the creation of new institutes and the Gynecology and Obstetrics Hospital. In addition, the arts diffusion was boosted when art groups were created, giving recognition to the university.

In the next decade, expansion and growing of the different academic entities decreased, new academic plans and programs were approved and the university's initiation stage disappeared.

In the '90s, the Universidad Veracruzana faced new challenges which represented the changing conditions in the social, economic, and political environments, dealing with the international competition and as with the deficiency of financial aid, all which made public universities reconsider their academic organization structure. Thus, its current educational development plan is based upon the General Development Plan 1997-2005.2 In this context, the institution got into an innovation process with the Programa de Consolidación y Proyección Hacia el Siglo XXI, 1997-2003 (Consolidation and Projection towards the 21st Century program, 1997-2001).3. In 1997, the state government recognized the right of the institution to have a new social and legal status and awarded the institution with autonomy. The same year, Doctor Víctor Arredondo became the university’s president.

Over the more than 70 years of its existence, the Universidad Veracruzana has expanded its services to many areas of the state of Veracruz. Present in five of the most important economic regions of the state with schools in 14 cities: Xalapa, Veracruz, Boca del Río, Orizaba, Córdoba, Río Blanco, Amatlán, Nogales, Camerino Z. Mendoza, Poza Rica, Tuxpan, Minatitlán, Coatzacoalcos and Acayucan. Only a few universities in the country have this accelerated geographical development. By the year 2006, its conversion into a university system of the state was an academic and administrative reality with five integrated campuses on each one of the regions. Today, Veracruzana is one of the largest universities in Mexico, with over 70,000 students enrolled.

Notable alumni 

 Raquel Torres Cerdán - chef and anthropologist.
 Juan Pablo Villalobos - writer.
 Fernanda Melchor - writer.

References

External links
Universidad Veracruzana Homepage 

Universidad Veracruzana
Veracruz (city)
Educational institutions established in 1944
1944 establishments in Mexico